Cojutepeque Futbol Club  was a Salvadoran professional football club based in Cojutepeque, Cuscatlán. The team ceased operation in 2003.

History
The team was in the first division of El Salvador from 1987 on for several years. Cojutepeque was a runner-up in the 1988–89 season, losing on penalties to L.A. Firpo in the finals after the game ended 2–2 after extra time.

Record

Year-by-Year

Club Records
 First Match (prior to creation of a league): vs. TBD (a club from TBD), Year
 First Match (official): vs. TBD, year
 Most points in La Primera: 43 points (14 win, 15 draws, 7 losses) 1988-89
 Least points in La Primera: 18 points (4 win, 10 draws, 22 losses) 1994-95
Record League defeat: 0–11 v L.A. Firpo. April 30, 1995.

Individual records
 Most capped player for El Salvador: 50 (0 whilst at Cojutepeque), TBD
 Most international caps for El Salvador while a Cojutepeque player: 1, TBD
 Most goals in a season, all competitions: unknown player, O (Year/year) (00 in League, 00 in Cup competitions)
 Most goals in a season,  Primera División de Fútbol Profesional: Hugo Ventura, 17 (1988-89)

Honours
Cojutepeque's first trophy was the Liga Ascensio, which they won  in 1986-1987. They won 1  Segunda División title in 1986-1987.

Cojutepeque's honours include the following:

Domestic honours

Leagues
Primera División de Fútbol de El Salvador
 Runners up (1): 1988–89
 Segunda División Salvadorean and predecessors 
 Champions: (1): 1986-1987

List of notable players
Players with senior international caps
   Emiliano Pedrozo
  Hugo Ventura
  Nelson Mauricio Quintanilla
  José María Rivas
  Héctor Edmundo Valdivieso
  Norberto Huezo
  Rodolfo Alfaro
  Mauricio Alfaro
  Guillermo Ragazzone
  Jose Luis Rugamas
  Raul Chamagua
  Miguel Diaz
  Pércival Piggott
  Ruben Guevara
  Patricio Antonio Guevara
  José Alfredo Poyatos
  Victor Rene Mendieta
  Carlos Maldonado
  Raul Esnal

Manager history
  Oscar Emigdio Benítez (1985,1988)
  Raúl Corcio Zavaleta (1986–1987)
  Conrado Miranda (1989)
  Juan Quarterone (1993–94)
  Raúl Héctor Cocherari (1994–95)
  José Amaya (1997)
  Rigoberto Guzmán

References

Cojutepeque F.C.